Andreas Meklau (born 7 June 1967 in Bruck an der Mur) is an Austrian former motorcycle racer. He competed in the Superbike World Championship for over ten years. He won one race at the Österreichring in 1993.

Career statistics

Superbike World Championship

Races by year
(key) (Races in bold indicate pole position) (Races in italics indicate fastest lap)

Grand Prix motorcycle racing

Races by year
(key) (Races in bold indicate pole position, races in italics indicate fastest lap)

References

External links
MotoGP.com rider profile

Austrian motorcycle racers
Superbike World Championship riders
500cc World Championship riders
1967 births
Living people
People from Bruck an der Mur
Sportspeople from Styria